Henrik Victor Stephansen (born 6 August 1988) is a Danish rower who competes in single sculls. He won the world title in lightweight category in 2011, 2012 and 2013 and placed 13th at the 2012 Olympics. He also won the European title in the men's lightweight single scull in 2013.  He holds the world lightweight 2000 m record in indoor rowing and was also the first man in the lightweight category to go under 6 minutes for 2000 m.

References

External links

 
 

1988 births
Living people
Danish male rowers
Rowers from Copenhagen
Rowers at the 2012 Summer Olympics
Olympic rowers of Denmark
World Rowing Championships medalists for Denmark